Follow the Rainbow is the thirteenth studio album by American keyboardist George Duke released in 1979 through Epic Records. 
The album peaked at No. 3 on the Billboard Top Jazz Albums chart and at No. 17 on the Billboard Top Soul Albums chart.

Overview
Follow the Rainbow was produced by George Duke.
Recording sessions for the album took place at Westlake Recording Studios in Hollywood, California, except for track 8, "Corine", which was recorded at Electric Lady Studios in New York City.

Duke played various keyboard instruments on Follow the Rainbow, including Fender Rhodes, Yamaha Electric Grand, Yamaha Grand Piano 9', Hohner D-6 clavinet, ARP Odyssey, Minimoog, Oberheim, Prophet, Funkosizer, Crumer Strings. The album also featured contributions from Napoleon Murphy Brock & Lynn Davis on vocals, Roland Bautista & Charles "Icarus" Johnson on guitars, Ricky Lawson & Leon Chancler on drums, Larry Williams, Jerry Hey and Sheila Escovedo among others.

Singles
The singles "Party Down", "Say That You Will" and "Pluck". "Say That You Will" each reached No. 25 on the Billboard Hot R&B/Hip-Hop Songs chart.

Track listing

Personnel 
 George Duke – vocals, grand piano, electric pianos, clavinet, synthesizers
 Charles Foster Johnson – guitar
 Roland Bautista – electric guitar (1, 2)
 Kevin "Serious Biz" Dugan – guitar, bass (1, 2, 4-10)
 Byron Miller – bass (3), vocals (3)
 Ricky Lawson – drums (1-6, 9, 10)
 Leon "Ndugu" Chancler – drums (7, 8)
 Sheila E. – percussion, vocals
 Larry Williams – alto saxophone, tenor saxophone, flute
 Rick Culver – trombone
 Jerry Hey – trumpet, flugelhorn
 Napoleon Murphy Brock – vocals
 Lynn Davis – vocals
 Josie James – vocals
 Darrell "Sweet D" Cox – cosmotic narrator (1, 3)
 Children of Distinction – choir (6)

Production 
 George Duke – producer
 Kerry McNabb – recording (1-7, 9, 10), mixing 
 David Palmer – recording (8)
 Dave Rideau – assistant engineer
 John Golden – mastering at Kendun Recorders (Burbank, California).
 Tony Lane – art direction
 Tom Drennon – design
 John Laven – illustration
 Bruce Talamon – photography

Chart history

References 

1979 albums
George Duke albums
Epic Records albums
Albums produced by George Duke
Albums recorded at Electric Lady Studios